Seabright (population 522) is a community within the Halifax Regional Municipality Nova Scotia between French Village and Glen Margaret on Route 333 along the Lighthouse Route. It was home to the noted Canadian curator and historian Niels Jannasch (1924–2001).

References
Explore HRM

General Service Areas in Nova Scotia
Communities in Halifax, Nova Scotia